Gabriele Bove (born 16 April 1998) is an Italian football player.

Club career
He made his Serie C debut for Sambenedettese on 27 August 2017 in a game against Modena.

On 31 January 2020, he signed with Gubbio.

References

External links
 

1998 births
Footballers from Turin
Living people
Italian footballers
A.S. Sambenedettese players
A.S. Gubbio 1910 players
Serie C players
Association football midfielders